A cattle drive is the process of moving a herd of cattle from one place to another, usually moved and herded by cowboys on horses.

Europe

In medieval central Europe, annual cattle drives brought Hungarian Grey cattle across the Danube River to the beef markets of Western Europe. In the 16th century the Swiss operated cattle drives over the St. Gotthard Pass to the markets in Bellinzona and Lugano and into Lombardy in northern Italy. The drives had ended by 1700 when sedentary dairy farming proved more profitable.   In the eighteenth century up to 80,000 cattle were driven South from Scotland each year.  From 1850 cattle trains were established from Aberdeen to London.

Australia
Australia is noted for long  drives. Patsy Durack, for instance, left Queensland for the Kimberley in Western Australia in 1885 with 8,000 cattle, arriving with only half that number some two years and two months later, completing a drive of some 3,000 miles. Indeed, long cattle drives continued well into the latter half of the twentieth century.

On March 26, 1883 two Scottish/Australian families, the MacDonalds and the McKenzies, began a huge cattle drive from Clifford's Creek near Goulburn, New South Wales to the Kimberley, where they established "Fossil Downs" station.
The journey of over 6,000 km lasted more than three years and involved Charles ('Charlie') MacDonald (1851–1903) and William Neil
('Willie') MacDonald (1860–1910), sons of Donald MacDonald from Broadford on the Isle of Skye (who had sailed from Scotland in the
1830s). The family moved to Clifford's Creek, Laggan, and the brothers had become expert bushmen.
The cattle drive was undertaken after Donald MacDonald heard glowing reports of the Kimberley from Scots/Australian explorer
Alexander Forrest in 1879. The MacDonalds and the McKenzies formed a joint venture to obtain leases in the Kimberley and to stock them by overlanding the cattle.
The brothers were joined by their cousins Alexander and Donald MacKenzie, Peter Thomson, James McGeorge and Jasper Pickles. They set out with 670 cattle, 32 bullocks yoked to two wagons and 86 horses. All foodstuffs and equipment for the long journey were carried in the wagons. Drought conditions delayed progress and most of the original party, apart from Charlie and Willie MacDonald, withdrew long before Cooper's Creek was reached. Stock losses were replaced, only to be reduced again by the continued drought. Despite a grueling journey through crocodile- and mosquito-infested territory in the top end with frequent Aboriginal attacks, the cattle eventually arrived at the junction of the Margaret and Fitzroy Rivers in July 1886 and "Fossil Downs" station was established.
It is the longest cattle drive in history.

United States

Cattle drives involved cowboys on horseback moving herds of cattle long distances to market. Cattle drives were at one time a major economic activity in the American West, particularly between the years 1866-1895, when 10 million cattle were herded from Texas to railheads in Kansas for shipments to stockyards in Chicago and points east.  Drives usually took place in Texas on the Goodnight-Loving Trail (1866), Potter-Bacon trail (1883), Western trail (1874), Chisholm Trail (1867) and Shawnee Trail (1840s).

Due to the extensive treatment of cattle drives in fiction and film, the cowboy tending to a herd of cattle has become the worldwide iconic image of the American West.

See also
Droving
Cowboy
Gaucho
Ranch
Drover (Australian)
Station (Australian agriculture)

References

External links

Cattle Drives  Documentary produced by Oregon Field Guide

Drives
Transhumance